The International Payments Framework (IPF) was an initiative launched in 2010 to create a global framework for payment processing by the  International Payments Framework Association, a trade association headquartered in Atlanta, in the United States. The IPF standard is currently used by some organisations to process payments between the United States and Europe.

IPF creates rules, processes, and inter-member agreements that allow IPF's members to minimize the cost of cross-border payments. Its members include the United States Federal Reserve and other central banks, as well as other payments industry entities such as financial institutions and ACH operators.

IPF is similar to the Single Euro Payments Area (SEPA) in that both initiatives aim to facilitate international payments, base their standards on ISO 20022, and involve mostly banks as their main participants.

IPF differs from SEPA because IPF is global rather than limited to Europe; IPF is market-based rather than a political initiative; IPF involves more public entities, smaller banks, and clearing houses, rather than larger banks; and IPF superimposes a standard that allows existing national standards to communicate with each other rather than replacing them with a new standard. Unlike SEPA documentation, which is available on the European Payments Council's website,  IPF documentation is not available to the public.

See also 
 Electronic Banking Internet Communication Standard
 Financial Information eXchange
 FpML
 ISO 20022
 Single Euro Payments Area
 SWIFT

References 

Payment systems
Financial routing standards
Financial metadata
Standards of the United States